Harold Palmer Smith Jr. (born November 30, 1935) is an American professor, consultant, and expert on defense policy. He was Assistant to the Secretary of Defense (Atomic Energy) from June 1993 to March 1996, when the name of the position changed to Assistant Secretary of Defense for Nuclear, Chemical & Biological Defense Programs, and remained in the position until January 1998.

Career 
Smith holds the appointment of Distinguished Scholar in Residence with the Institute for Governmental Studies at the University of California at Berkeley (UCB) where he has been responsible for the Harold Smith Seminar Series focusing on national and international defense policy and is a major participant in its successor series.  He is also an advisor to the Lawrence Livermore National Laboratory (LLNL) on defense issues and on enhancing joint study with UCB of data science (Big Data).

Born in Greensburg, Pennsylvania, Smith attended the Massachusetts Institute of Technology (MIT), earning a B.S. degree in mechanical engineering in 1957 and an M.S. degree in nuclear engineering in 1958. His master's thesis was entitled Combined natural and forced convection, laminar flow, on a constant temperature, vertical, flat plate and his thesis advisor was Richard J. Nickerson. After completing his master's degree, he began research for the doctoral thesis Dynamics and control of nuclear rocket engines under the supervision of Alan H. Stenning.

In 1960, after receiving his Ph.D. degree in nuclear engineering from MIT, he joined the faculty of UCB where he published extensively on the optimal control of nuclear systems and on the interaction of radiation with surfaces.  He retired as professor and chairman of the Department of Applied Science in 1976 and formed the Palmer Smith Corporation, a consulting firm specializing in management of high technology programs.  The firm was retained by many of the largest defense contractors.  He was one of the early principals of SAIC, RDA-Logicon, and JAYCOR

Smith was awarded a White House Fellowship in 1966 and was assigned as a Special Assistant to the Secretary of Defense. Since that time, he has served as an advisor on numerous governmental boards on national security policy, giving particular attention to projects requiring a broad range of technical and managerial skills.  Of particular note are his chairmanship of the Vulnerability Task Force of the Defense Science Board and a special study for (then) Secretary of Defense James R. Schlesinger on the Airborne Warning and Control System (AWACS); i.e., the Smith Report.

In 1993, Smith accepted an appointment with the Clinton Administration as Assistant Secretary of Defense for Nuclear, Chemical, and Biological Defense Programs with responsibilities for reduction and maintenance of the American and NATO arsenals of nuclear weapons, dismantlement of the chemical weapon stockpile, oversight of the chemical and biological defense programs, management of counter-proliferation acquisition, and management of treaties related to strategic weapons.   He was responsible for implementation of the Cooperative Threat Reduction (Nunn Lugar) program, which assists the former Soviet Union in the dismantlement of their weapons of mass destruction and in converting their related industries to commercial production.  The Defense Special Weapons Agency and the On-Site Inspection Agency reported to him.  He returned to private life in 1998.

He is an Elected Fellow of the American Physical Society and has thrice been honored with the Distinguished Public Service Award, as well as awards by the Military Services and Defense Agencies.  He has published articles involving national security in  Arms Control Today.

Personal life
He married Marian Bamford Smith in 1958.  They have three children: Natalya (1959), Peter (1960) and Erika (1963).

References

External links 
 Thinking about the 'Unthinkables' in the post-911 World
 The Cooperative Threat Reduction Program and the End of the Cold War

1935 births
Living people
People from Greensburg, Pennsylvania
MIT School of Engineering alumni
American nuclear engineers
University of California, Berkeley faculty
Fellows of the American Physical Society
American consultants